Harold Victor Bauer (28 April 1873 – 12 March 1951) was a noted pianist of Jewish heritage who began his musical career as a violinist.

Biography
Harold Bauer was born in Kingston upon Thames; his father was a German violinist and his mother was English. He took up the study of the violin under the direction of his father and Adolf Pollitzer. He made his debut as a violinist in London in 1883, and for nine years toured England. In 1892, however, he went to Paris and studied the piano under Ignacy Jan Paderewski for a year, though still maintaining his interest in the violin. An anecdote reports that Paderewski jokingly told Bauer to concentrate on the piano because "You have such beautiful hair".  In 1893, in Paris, he and Achille Rivarde premiered Frederick Delius's Violin Sonata in B major.

During 1893-94 he travelled all through Russia accompanying the noted soprano Mademoiselle Nikita and giving piano recitals and concerts, after which he returned to Paris. Further recitals in the French capital brought him renown, and he almost immediately received engagements in France, Germany and Spain. His reputation was rapidly enhanced by these performances, and his field of operation extended through the Netherlands, Belgium, Switzerland, England, Scandinavia and the United States.

In 1900, Harold Bauer made his debut in America with the Boston Symphony Orchestra, performing the U.S. premiere of Johannes Brahms' Piano Concerto No.1 in D minor.  On 18 December 1908, he gave the world premiere performance of Claude Debussy's piano suite Children's Corner in Paris. After that he settled in the United States, and was a founder of the Beethoven Association.

Between 1915 and 1929 he recorded over 100 pieces for the Duo-Art and Ampico reproducing pianos, one of the most prolific virtuoso pianists in this medium of his era.

Harold Bauer was also an influential teacher and editor, heading the Piano Department at the well known Manhattan School of Music. Starting in 1941, Bauer taught winter master classes at the University of Miami and served as a Visiting Professor at the University of Hartford Hartt School of Music with Maestro and Founder - Moshe Paranov and head of the Piano Department - Raymond Hanson, from 1946 until his death in Miami, Florida, in 1951.

He published Harold Bauer, His Book (New York, 1948).

Family 
Harold's sister Ethel Bauer was also a concert pianist active in London. Harold was married twice. He first married the divorcée Maria Knapp (1861–1940) in 1906 until her death.  In January 1941, he married again, the concert pianist, colleague, and his former student, Wynne Pyle.  He had no children by either marriage.

Students 
Students of Harold Bauer include notably Abbey Simon, Dora Zaslavsky, and Robert Schrade (1924-2015), touring concert pianist (with critically acclaimed performances at Carnegie Hall, Town Hall, Lincoln Center, Greece, Italy, Germany, the Netherlands, etc.), co-founder of Sevenars Concerts  in Massachusetts with wife Rolande Maxwell Young (who also studied with Bauer), and teacher at several schools, including at the Manhattan School of Music (and MSM Prep Division). Robert Schrade was praised by leading critics, including Virgil Thomson and Harold Schonberg, and remastered recordings have been highly praised by American Record Guide and others.

Harold Bauer taught many other prominent pianists in his day, including composer Viola Cole-Audet, John Elvin, who was a piano professor at Oberlin College in Ohio  and Consuelo Elsa Clark, a piano teacher at the New York College of Music from 1918 to 1968 and the teacher of the composer Michael Jeffrey Shapiro.

Recordings
A Review of the Complete Acoustic Solo Recordings of Harold Bauer
Harold Bauer plays Bach - Chromatic Fantasy and Fugue in Dm - Phillips/Duo-Art Rolls 7316/7317, issued Apr-1929

References
General references

Inline citations

External links

Finding aid to Harold Bauer papers at Columbia University. Rare Book & Manuscript Library.

1873 births
1951 deaths
British classical pianists
Male classical pianists
Royal Philharmonic Society Gold Medallists
British people of German descent
Honorary Members of the Royal Philharmonic Society
British expatriates in the United States